Raymond Cadieux (born December 27, 1941) is a Canadian former ice hockey player who played for the Canadian national team. He won a bronze medal at the 1968 Winter Olympics.

After his years with the national team: "A chartered accountant, Ray Cadieux remained in Winnipeg where he has been a long-time volunteer for CAA Manitoba and Misericordia Health Centre."

References

External links

1941 births
Living people
Canadian ice hockey right wingers
Ice hockey people from Ottawa
Ice hockey players at the 1964 Winter Olympics
Ice hockey players at the 1968 Winter Olympics
Olympic bronze medalists for Canada
Olympic ice hockey players of Canada
Olympic medalists in ice hockey
Medalists at the 1968 Winter Olympics